The Sheerness and District Tramways operated a tramway service in Sheerness between 1903 and 1917.

History

The system opened on 9 April 1903 with a depot located at  near Sheerness East railway station. There were 12 tramcars obtained from Brush Electrical Engineering Company of Loughborough.

In 1904, tramcars 9-12 were sold to the City of Birmingham Tramways Company Ltd.

Closure

This was the first electric tramway to close in Britain. There was a shortage of spares for its German-manufactured Siemens and Halske overhead equipment during the First World War.

Tramcars 1 to 8 were sold to Darlington Corporation Light Railways in 1917.

References

External links
 Sheerness and District Tramways at the British Tramway Company Badges and Buttons website.

Sheerness
Tram transport in England
3 ft 6 in gauge railways in England